The Butler County Courthouse is a public courthouse constructed in 1909, in El Dorado, Kansas. It was designed by George P. Washburn & Sons to serve as the main county courthouse for Butler County. The Romanesque Revival courthouse was typical of Washburn's courthouse designs; of the eleven surviving courthouses designed by the architect, nine are Romanesque. The red brick courthouse features a central clock tower and four octagonal corner towers, a statue of the Goddess of Justice, and a hipped roof with cross gables, all common features of Washburn's work. It was added to the National Register of Historic Places in 2002.

Butler County was organized on February 11, 1859. The County Clerk has land records from 1887 and birth and death records from 1887 to 1911.

The courthouse is still in operation as such. Self-guided tours are also available during normal working hours.

See also 
 National Register of Historic Places listings in Butler County, Kansas

Gallery

References 

Government buildings completed in 1908
Buildings and structures in Butler County, Kansas
Courthouses on the National Register of Historic Places in Kansas
County courthouses in Kansas
El Dorado, Kansas
National Register of Historic Places in Butler County, Kansas
1908 establishments in Kansas